Old money is "the inherited wealth of established upper-class families (i.e. gentry, patriciate)" or "a person, family, or lineage possessing inherited wealth". The term typically describes a social class of the rich who have been able to maintain their wealth over multiple generations, often referring to perceived members of the de facto aristocracy in societies that historically lack an officially established aristocratic class (such as the United States).

The term is often used in contrast with new money.

United States 

Wealth—assets held by an individual or by a household—provides an important dimension of social stratification because it can pass from generation to generation, ensuring that a family's offspring will remain financially stable. Families with "old money" use accumulated assets or savings to bridge interruptions in income, thus guarding against downward social mobility.

"Old money" applies to those of the upper class whose wealth separates them from lower social classes. According to anthropologist W. Lloyd Warner, the upper class in the United States during the 1930s was divided into the upper-upper and the lower-upper classes. The lower-upper were those who did not come from traditionally wealthy families. They earned their money from investments and business, rather than inheritance. Examples include John D. Rockefeller, whose father was a traveling peddler; Cornelius Vanderbilt, whose father operated a ferry in New York Harbor; Henry Flagler, who was the son of a Presbyterian minister; and Andrew Carnegie, who was the son of a Scottish weaver. In contrast to the nouveau riche, whose riches were acquired in their own generation, the upper-upper class were families viewed as "quasi-aristocratic" and "high society". These families had been rich and prominent in the politics of the United States for generations. In many cases their prominence dated since before the American Revolution (1765–1783), when their ancestors had accumulated fortunes as members of the elite planter class, or as merchants, slave traders, ship-owners, or fur traders. In many cases, especially in Virginia, Maryland, and the Carolinas, the source of these families' wealth were vast tracts of land granted to their ancestors by the Crown or acquired by headright during the colonial period. These planter class families were often related to each other through intermarriage for more than 300 years, and are sometimes known as American gentry. They produced several Founding Fathers of the United States and a number of early presidents of the United States. An example of this social class was George Washington, who had an estimated net worth of $525 million (in 2016 dollars) due to his vast holdings of land and slaves, making him the second wealthiest man to serve as President of the United States.

After the American Civil War (1861–1865), many in this social class saw their wealth greatly reduced. Their slaves became freedmen. Union forces under Generals William Tecumseh Sherman and Philip Sheridan had also cut wide swaths of destruction through portions of Virginia, the Carolinas and Georgia. They destroyed crops, killed or confiscated livestock, burned barns and gristmills, and in some cases torched plantation houses and even entire cities such as Atlanta. They were using scorched earth tactics, designed to starve the Confederate States of America into submission. After the Thirteenth Amendment to the United States Constitution (1865) and the emancipation of the slaves, many plantations were converted to sharecropping. African American freedmen were working as sharecroppers on the same land which they had worked as slaves before the war. Despite the fact that their circumstances were greatly reduced, the enactment of Jim Crow laws and the disenfranchisement of freed black people allowed many planter class families in the Southern United States to regain their political prominence, if not their great wealth, following Reconstruction (1863–1877).

In the early 20th century, the upper-upper class were seen as more prestigious than the nouveau riche even if the nouveau riche had more wealth. During the late 19th century and early 20th century, the nouveau rich flaunted their wealth by building Gilded Age mansions that emulated the palaces of European royalty, while old money was more conservative. American "Old money" families tend to adhere to various Mainline Protestant denominations; Episcopalians and Presbyterians are the most prevalent among them.

Some families with "old money" include:
 The Byrd Family of Virginia is descended from William Byrd I who received a  grant on 27 October 1673 at the fall line of the James River that would later become the site of Richmond, Virginia. Byrd's son William Byrd II of Westover Plantation who inherited the land was an American planter and author from Charles City County in colonial Virginia. Although much of the family's wealth was squandered during the 18th century by William Byrd III through gambling and bad investments, descendant Richard Evelyn Byrd Sr. became wealthy as an apple grower in the Shenandoah Valley and publisher of the Winchester Star newspaper. He was elected to the Virginia House of Delegates in 1906 and served as Speaker from 1908 to 1914. His son Harry Flood Byrd was elected the 50th Governor of Virginia in 1925, and later served in the US Senate until his retirement in 1965. Byrd controlled a Democratic political machine known as the Byrd Organization that dominated Virginia politics for most of the 20th century. Byrd was succeeded in the US Senate by his son Harry F. Byrd Jr. who served until 1981. The family also produced early Ohio political leader and jurist, Charles Willing Byrd, and polar explorer, Rear Admiral Richard E. Byrd. 
 The Carter Family of Virginia is descended from Robert "King" Carter, of Lancaster County, who was a planter, businessman and colonist in Virginia and became one of the wealthiest men in the colonies accumulating over 300,000 acres of land. As President of the Governor's Council of the Virginia Colony, he was acting Governor of Virginia from 1726 to 1727 after the death in office of Governor Hugh Drysdale. He acquired the moniker "King" due to his great wealth, political power, and autocratic business methods. His many notable descendants include: Robert Burwell, a member of the Virginia House of Burgesses, Robert Carter III, who sat on the Virginia Governor's Council, Carter Braxton, a signer of Declaration of Independence, Mann Page a Virginia delegate to the Continental Congress in 1777, Confederate States Army General Robert E. Lee, Confederate Army first lieutenant Robert Randolph Carter, John Page, the 13th Governor of Virginia, Thomas Nelson Page, who served as US ambassador to Italy during the Woodrow Wilson administration, and civil engineer and industrialist William Nelson Page.
 The Lindsey family is descended from Robert Lindsey, a Scot who arrived in the 1660s in the English Colony of Virginia. He married Susanna Opie, an heiress of English wealth, a few years later. Susanna was the only child of John Opie, and heiress of the 100,000 (15 million dollars today) dollar fortune and estate that he had accumulated. Susanna predeceased her father, so the fortune passed to his son-in-law. During the American Revolution, the grandson and great grandson of Robert, Col. John M Lindsey and Capt. James Lindsey, decided to side with the Continental Army, allowing them to keep their fortune. The Lindsey family helped the later United States stay economically important. During the 19th and 20th centuries, the family invested in shipyards, port houses, railways, real estate and the early stock market. The family is today prominent in business, and American politics. Descendants of Robert include U.S. presidents George H.W Bush, George W. Bush, Abraham Lincoln, Theodore Roosevelt, Ronald Reagan, and John F. Kennedy, as well as the Vanderbilts, the Astors, and the Rockefellers. Many other descendants are successful entrepreneurs, governors, and congressmen.
 The Randolph family is descended from William Randolph, an American colonist who accumulated a vast fortune including over 20,000 acres (81 km2) of land as a planter and merchant, and played an important role in the history and government of the English colony of Virginia. He arrived in Virginia sometime between 1669 and 1673, and married Mary Isham a few years later. Randolph's descendants have included many prominent Americans, including U.S. President Thomas Jefferson, U.S. Chief Justice John Marshall, Confederate General, Robert E. Lee, Peyton Randolph, the first President of the Continental Congress, and Edmund Randolph, who served as the seventh Governor of Virginia, the second US Secretary of State, and the first U.S. Attorney General as well as many other notable individuals in Virginia and U.S. politics.
 The Roosevelt family of Manhattan arrived from the Netherlands as colonists in the 17th century and later became prominent in business and politics. Two distantly related branches of the family, from Oyster Bay on Long Island and Hyde Park in Dutchess County, rose to global political prominence with the elections of Presidents Theodore Roosevelt (1901–1909) and his fifth cousin Franklin D. Roosevelt (1933–1945), whose wife, First Lady Eleanor Roosevelt, was Theodore's niece. 
 The Cabots arrived in Salem from the Isle of Jersey in 1700 and made fortunes in shipping. At the age of 21, Godfrey Lowell Cabot (see Lowells below) founded the Cabot Corporation, the largest producer of carbon black in the country.
 The Lowell family are descended from Boston colonists. Francis Cabot Lowell began the fortune in shipping and later textiles. The family has produced several noteworthy individuals, including Abbott Lawrence Lowell, who presided over Harvard for 24 years.
 The Du Pont family fortune began in 1803, but they became an extraordinarily wealthy family by selling gunpowder during the American Civil War. By World War I, the DuPont family produced virtually all American gunpowder. In 1968, Ferdinand Lundberg declared the Du Pont fortune to be America's largest family fortune.  E. I. du Pont de Nemours and Company ranked 81st on the Fortune 500 list of the largest U.S. corporations.
 The Forbes family of Boston made their fortune in the shipping and later railroad industries as well as other investments. They have been a prominent wealthy family in the United States for 200 years.
 The Astor family made their fortune in the 18th century, through fur trading, real estate, the hotel industry and other investments.
 The Harrisons of Virginia is an American political family, of the Commonwealth of Virginia, whose direct descendants include a Founding Father of the United States, Benjamin Harrison V, and three U. S. presidents: William Henry Harrison, Benjamin Harrison, and Abraham Lincoln. The Virginia Harrison family consists primarily of two branches with origins in northern England. One branch, led by Benjamin Harrison I, journeyed by way of Bermuda to Virginia before 1633 and settled along the James River where they became wealthy planters; they are often referred to as the James River Harrisons. Successive generations of this branch served in the legislature of the Colony of Virginia, including Benjamin V, who was a signatory of the Declaration of Independence and later governor of Virginia. This branch of the Harrison family produced President William Henry Harrison, Benjamin V's son, and President Benjamin Harrison, William Henry's grandson, as well as another Virginia governor, Albertis Harrison. The family also includes two Chicago mayors and members of the U.S. House of Representatives and the U.S. Senate. The other branch of the Virginia Harrisons emigrated from Britain to New England in 1687 and moved south to the Shenandoah Valley of Virginia 50 years later; they were led by Isaiah Harrison. This branch most likely descended from an interim chaplain of the Jamestown Colony, Rev. Thomas Harrison, who was kindred to the James River Harrisons, but by 1650 had returned to England. President Abraham Lincoln descended from the Shenandoah Valley Harrisons, as did entertainer Elvis Presley. This branch of the family also included the founders of Harrisonburg and Dayton and physician J. Hartwell Harrison, who was part of the medical team that accomplished the world's first successful kidney transplant surgery. 

 The Griswold Family of Connecticut made their fortune in shipping, banking, railroads, and industry. They have been prominent in American politics, producing five governors and numerous senators and congressmen.
The Hartwick family is of mainly English and German descent, and their ancestry and fortune predates the American Revolution. The Hartwicks have produced several politicians and military generals, such as Edward Hartwick. By World War I, the family controlled most of the lumber in the United States. The Hartwicks philanthropic works include the founding of Hartwick College, and Hartwick Pines State Park.
 The Pitcairn family of Philadelphia made their fortune in chemical production and plate glass. They established a trust that continues to support 5th and 6th generation members. They were among Eisenhower and Nixon's largest supporters and regularly support the music and arts in Philadelphia and New York.
 The Van Leer family of Pennsylvania made their fortune in the iron business. They have been prominent in academia, business and American politics. Descendants include successful entrepreneurs, governors, congressmen, university presidents and university founders.
 The Whitney family is an American family notable for their business enterprises, social prominence, wealth and philanthropy, founded by John Whitney, who came from London, England to Watertown, Massachusetts in 1635. The Whitney family are members of the Episcopal Church.

Although many "old money" individuals do not rank as high on the list of Forbes 400 richest Americans as they once did, their wealth continues to grow. Many families increased their holdings by investment strategies such as the pooling of resources. For example, the Rockefeller family's estimated net worth of $1 billion in the 1930s grew to $8.5 billion by 2000—that is, not adjusted for inflation. In 60 years, four of the richest families in the United States increased their combined $2–4 billion in 1937 to $38 billion without holding large shares in emerging industries. When adjusted for inflation, the actual dollar wealth of many of these families has shrunk since the '30s.

From a private wealth manager's perspective, "old money" can be classified into two: active "old money" and passive "old money". The former includes inheritors who, despite the inherited wealth at their disposal or that which they can access in the future, choose to pursue their own career or set up their own businesses. Paris Hilton and Sir Stelios Haji-Ioannou are examples of this category. On the other hand, passive "old money" are those who are the idle rich or those who are not wealth producers.

"Old money" contrasts with the nouveau riche and parvenus. These fall under the category "new money" (those not from traditionally wealthy families).

Europe 
The Rothschild family, as an example, established finance houses across Europe from the 18th century and was ennobled by the Habsburg Emperor and Queen Victoria. Throughout the 19th century, they controlled the largest fortune in the world, in today's terms many hundreds of billions. The family has, at least to some extent, maintained its wealth for over two centuries. The Rothschilds were not, however, considered "old money" by their British counterparts. In Britain, the term generally exclusively refers to the nobility - that is, the peerage and landed gentry - who traditionally live off the land inherited paternally. The British concept is analogous to good lineage and it is not uncommon to find someone with "old money" who is actually poor or insolvent. By 2001, however, those belonging to this category—the aristocratic landowners—are still part of the wealthiest list in the United Kingdom. For instance, the Duke of Westminster, by way of his Grosvenor estate, owns large swaths of properties in London that include 200 acres of Belgravia and 100 acres of Mayfair. There is also the case of Viscount Portman, who is the owner of 100 acres of land north of Oxford Street.

Many countries had wealth-based restrictions on voting. In France, out of a nation of 27 million people, only 80,000 to 90,000 were allowed to vote in the 1820 French legislative election and the richest one-quarter of them had two votes.

Influences on popular culture 

The ITV television series Downton Abbey frequently contrasts the differences between Old Money and New Money in Britain during the early 20th century. Notably between the newspaperman Sir Richard Carlisle and the heiress Lady Mary Crawley, the distinction being the aggression of the parvenu Sir Richard and the noblesse oblige of the Crawleys.

Perhaps the most famous critique of the tension between Old Money and New Money in American literature can be found in F. Scott Fitzgerald's The Great Gatsby. The characters in possession of old money, represented by the Buchanan family (Tom and Daisy), get away with murder; while those with new money, represented by Gatsby himself, are alternately embraced and scorned by other characters in the book. Fitzgerald vastly critiques people in possession of old money through his narrator Nick Carraway: "They were careless people, Tom and Daisy—they smashed up things and creatures and then retreated back into their money or their vast carelessness or whatever it was that kept them together, and let other people clean up the mess they had made."

See also 

 American gentry
 Aristocracy
 Black elite
 Boston Brahmin
 First Families of Virginia
 Gentry
 Grand Burgher (German Großbürger)
 Hanseaten (class)
 High culture
 La Distinction
 Landed gentry
 Mentifact
 Nobility
 Nouveau riche
 Old Philadelphians
 Parvenu
 Patrician (post-Roman Europe)
 Preppy
 Social environment
 Social Register
 Social status
 Status–income disequilibrium
 Symbolic capital
 The Four Hundred (Gilded Age)
 Rentier capitalism
 White Anglo-Saxon Protestant

References

Further reading 
 Fisher, Nick, and Hans Van Wees, eds. Aristocracy in Antiquity: Redefining Greek and Roman Elites (ISD LLC, 2015).
 Janssens, Paul, and Bartolomé Yun-Casalilla, eds. European Aristocracies and Colonial Elites: Patrimonial Management Strategies and Economic Development, 15th–18th Centuries (Routledge, 2017).
 McDonogh, Gary Wray. Good families of Barcelona: A social history of power in the industrial era (Princeton University Press, 2014).
 Pincon, Michel, and Monique Pincon-Charlot. Grand Fortunes. Dynasties and Forms of Wealth in France (1998) excerpt
 Porter, John. The vertical mosaic: An analysis of social class and power in Canada (1965).
 Rothacher, Albrecht. The Japanese power elite (2016).
 Schutte, Kimberly. Women, Rank, and Marriage in the British Aristocracy, 1485–2000: An Open Elite? (2014).
 Stone, Lawrence. An open elite?: England, 1540–1880 (1986).

United States
 
 Allen, Irving Lewis. "WASP—From Sociological Concept to Epithet", Ethnicity 2.2 (1975): 153–162.
 Baltzell, E. Digby. Philadelphia Gentlemen: The Making of a New Upper Class (1958).
 Beckert, Sven. The monied metropolis: New York City and the consolidation of the American bourgeoisie, 1850–1896 (2003).
 Brooks, David. Bobos in paradise: The new upper class and how they got there (2010)
 Davis, Donald F. "The Price of Conspicious [sic] Production: The Detroit Elite and the Automobile Industry, 1900–1933." Journal of Social History 16.1 (1982): 21–46. online
 Farnum, Richard. "Prestige in the Ivy League: Democratization and discrimination at Penn and Columbia, 1890–1970." in Paul W. Kingston and Lionel S. Lewis, eds. The high-status track: Studies of elite schools and stratification (1990).
 Foulkes, Nick. High Society – The History of America's Upper Class, (Assouline, 2008) .
 Fraser, Steve and Gary Gerstle, eds. Ruling America: A History of Wealth and Power in a Democracy, Harvard University Press, 2005, .
 Ghent, Jocelyn Maynard, and Frederic Cople Jaher. "The Chicago Business Elite: 1830–1930. A Collective Biography." Business History Review 50.3 (1976): 288–328. online
 Hood, Clifton. In Pursuit of Privilege: A History of New York City's Upper Class and the Making of a Metropolis (2016). Covers 1760–1970.
 Ingham, John N. The Iron Barons: A Social Analysis of an American Urban Elite, 1874–1965 (1978)
 Jaher, Frederic Cople, ed. The Rich, the Well Born, and the Powerful: Elites and Upper Classes in History (1973), essays by scholars
 Jaher, Frederick Cople. The Urban Establishment: Upper Strata in Boston, New York, Chicago, Charleston, and Los Angeles (1982).
 Lundberg, Ferdinand: The Rich and the Super-Rich: A Study in the Power of Money Today (1968)
 McConachie, Bruce A. "New York operagoing, 1825–50: creating an elite social ritual." American Music (1988): 181–192.  online
 Maggor, Noam. Brahmin Capitalism: Frontiers of Wealth and Populism in America's First Gilded Age (Harvard UP, 2017); 304 pp. online review
 
 Phillips, Kevin P. Wealth and Democracy: A Political History of the American Rich, Broadway Books 2003, .
 Story, Ronald. (1980) The forging of an aristocracy: Harvard & the Boston upper class, 1800-1870
 Williams, Peter W. Religion, Art, and Money: Episcopalians and American Culture from the Civil War to the Great Depression (2016), especially in New York City

High society (social class)
Oligarchy
Social classes
Social divisions
Social groups
Upper class
Wealth concentration